A number of countries have attempted to restrict the import of cryptography tools.

Rationale
Countries may wish to restrict import of cryptography technologies for a number of reasons:
 Imported cryptography may have backdoors or security holes (e.g. the FREAK vulnerability), intentional or not, which allows the country or group who created the backdoor technology, for example the National Security Agency (NSA), to spy on persons using the imported cryptography; therefore the use of cryptography is restricted to that which the government thinks is safe, or which it develops itself.
 Citizens can anonymously communicate with each other, preventing any external party from monitoring them.
 Encrypted transactions may impede external entities to control the conducting of business.
 Cryptography may sometimes increase levels of privacy within the country beyond what the government wishes.

Status by country
The Electronic Privacy Information Center and Global Internet Liberty Campaign reports use a color code to indicate the level of restriction, with the following meanings:
 Green: No restriction
 Yellow: License required for importation
 Red: Total ban

See also

 Export of cryptography

External links
 Cryptography and Liberty 1998, GILC Report
 Crypto-Law survey 2013

Export and import control of cryptography